Płudnica  is a rural village in the administrative district of Gmina Iłża, within Radom County, Masovian Voivodeship, in east-central Poland.
It contains the hamlet of Trupienie.

References

Villages in Radom County